Exploratory surgery is a diagnostic method used by doctors when trying to find a diagnosis for an ailment. With the invention of modern imaging techniques, exploratory surgery is becoming less common in humans. Due to the high cost and lower availability of advanced imaging for animals, exploratory surgery is more common in animals in modern practice.

Exploratory surgery in humans

Exploratory surgery is used to make a diagnosis when typical imaging techniques fail to find an accurate diagnosis. The use of new technologies such as MRIs have made exploratory surgeries less frequent. Many kinds of exploratory surgeries can now be performed using endoscopy which uses a camera and minimal incisions instead of more invasive techniques. 

The most common use of exploratory surgery in humans is in the abdomen, a laparotomy. If a camera is used, it's called a laparoscopy. A laparotomy can be used to diagnose cancer, endometriosis, gallstones, gastrointestinal perforation, appendicitis, diverticulitis, liver abscess, ectopic pregnancy, and other conditions involving abdominal organs. A biopsy can be performed during the procedure.

Exploratory surgery in animals
Because animals cannot voice their symptoms as easily as humans, exploratory surgery is more common in animals. Exploratory surgery is done when looking for a foreign body that may be lodged in the animal's body, when looking for cancer, or when looking for various other gastrointestinal problems. It is a fairly routine procedure that is done only after tests and bloodwork reveal nothing abnormal.

References

Surgery
Veterinary procedures